Inge Clement (born 26 June 1977) is a Belgian judoka. She competed in the women's half-lightweight event at the 2000 Summer Olympics.

References

External links
 

1977 births
Living people
Belgian female judoka
Olympic judoka of Belgium
Judoka at the 2000 Summer Olympics
Sportspeople from Ostend
21st-century Belgian women